The engrailed and small engrailed (Ectropis crepuscularia) are moths of the family Geometridae found from the British Isles through central and eastern Europe to the Russian Far East and Kazakhstan. The western Mediterranean and  Asia Minor and the Caucasus represent the southern limit of the distribution (with the Balkan countries). In the north, the distribution area ends at the Arctic Circle. It also occurs in North America. Debate exists as to whether they make up one species, or whether E. crepuscularia actually refers only to the small engrailed, with the engrailed proper being separable as E. bistortata. 

The ground colour of the wings is buff or grey, variably marked with darker fascia and a pale postdiscal crossline. The darker markings are not usually as strong as in the rather similar willow beauty. Melanic forms occur fairly frequently. One or two broods are produced each year. In the British Isles, the adults can be seen at any time between March and August; this time range may vary in other parts of this moth's range. The species flies at night and is attracted to light.

The greyish caterpillar is truly polyphagous, feeding on a huge range of plants. As a caterpillar, the species is known as the saddleback looper. The species overwinters as a pupa.

Recorded food plants

 Acer, maple
 Aconitum, monkshood
 Alnus, alder
 Aquilegia, columbine
 Betula, birch
 Calluna vulgaris, heather
 Camellia japonica, Japanese camellia
 Castanea, chestnut
 Centaurea, star thistle
 Cirsium arvense, creeping thistle
 Cornus, dogwood
 Daphniphyllum
 Diervilla, bush honeysuckle
 Frangula, alder buckthorn
 Fraxinus, ash
 Genista, broom
 Glycine, soybean
 Hypericum maculatum, imperforate St. John's wort
 Ilex, holly
 Juglans, walnut
 Larix, Larch
 Lindera, spice bush
 Lonicera, honeysuckle
 Lythrum salicaria, purple loosestrife
 Malus, apple
 Philadelphus, mock-orange
 Picea, spruce
 Pieris
 Pinus, pine
 Plectranthus
 Populus, poplar
 Pseudotsuga, Douglas fir
 Quercus, oak
 Ribes rubrum, redcurrant
 Rosa, rose
 Rubus idaeus, raspberry
 Rumex, dock
 Salix, willow
 Sambucus, elder
 Shepherdia canadensis, Canada buffaloberry
 Sorbus spp., rowans
 Spartina, cordgrass
 Thuja
 Trifolium, clover
 Tsuga, hemlock
 Ulmus, elm
 Vaccinium
 Zanthoxylum

References

Further reading
 Chinery, Michael Collins Guide to the Insects of Britain and Western Europe 1986 (Reprinted 1991)
 Skinner, Bernard Colour Identification Guide to Moths of the British Isles 1984

External links

Engrailed on UKMoths

Lepiforum e.V.

Boarmiini
Moths described in 1775
Moths of Asia
Moths of Europe
Moths of North America
Taxa named by Michael Denis
Taxa named by Ignaz Schiffermüller